Running From a Gamble is the second studio album by American indie rock band Company of Thieves. It was released on May 17, 2011.

Track listing

External links

2011 albums
Company of Thieves (band) albums
Wind-up Records albums